Ryan Marcus Powdrell (born December 20, 1983) is a former American football fullback. He was signed by the Green Bay Packers as an undrafted free agent in 2007. He played college football at Southern California, and was also a member of the Tampa Bay Buccaneers, Pittsburgh Steelers, and Seattle Seahawks.

Early years
Prior to his HS days Ryan played on some talented Pop Warner teams as a tailback, corner, and punter. Having played numerous positions started but did not stop in his youth days.

Powdrell prepped at powerhouse Mission Viejo High School where he graduated in 2002 playing Middle Linebacker & Fullback. He helped lead Mission Viejo to their first of four consecutive CIF-SS Championship game appearances in his senior season (2001) an 18-9 win over Chino High School. Powdrell also prepped with fellow Trojans Drew Radovich and Mark Sanchez

College career
Powdrell played college football at the University of Southern California after transferring from Saddleback College in Mission Viejo, California. Switched from linebacker to fullback before his first season with USC, Powdrell rushed for 9 yards on 2 carries, and caught 4 passes for 72 yards and a touchdown in USC Trojans' 2006 season opening 50-14 win against the Arkansas Razorbacks but suffered a season-ending injury early in the second game against Nebraska.

Professional career

Green Bay Packers
After going undrafted in the 2007 NFL Draft, Powdrell signed with the Green Bay Packers on May 4, 2007. He spent his rookie season on injured reserve. Powdrell was released by the Packers on August 25, 2008.

Tampa Bay Buccaneers
Powdrell was signed to the practice squad of the Tampa Bay Buccaneers on October 15, 2008. He was released on October 22.

Pittsburgh Steelers
Powdrell was signed by the Pittsburgh Steelers on February 12, 2009. He was released on June 18, 2009.

Seattle Seahawks
Powdrell signed with the Seattle Seahawks on April 15, 2010. Powdrell was released on August 7, 2010 due to a calf injury he sustained in practice.

Omaha Nighthawks
Powdrell was signed by the Omaha Nighthawks of the United Football League on September 2, 2010, but was released by the Nighthawks the next day after Powdrell re-injured his calf.

Personal life
Powdrell currently resides in Wareham, Massachusetts with his wife Taryn, and their two daughters, Rhylen and Kamara. Powdrell currently plays for the Taunton Gladiators, a premier semi-pro football team based out of Taunton, Massachusetts. Powdrell led Taunton to the 2010 Eastern Football League Championship with a 32-21 victory over the Clinton Irish Blizzard.

Powdrell led Taunton back to the EFL Championship Game in 2011, but were defeated 20-9 by their neighboring rival, the Middleboro Cobras. The Middleboro Cobras are considered a powerhouse football team, and are viewed as one of the best semi-pro football organizations in the country.

References

External links
USC Trojans bio
Green Bay Packers bio
Tampa Bay Buccaneers bio
Pittsburgh Steelers bio

1983 births
Living people
Players of American football from New Mexico
Players of American football from California
American football linebackers
American football fullbacks
USC Trojans football players
Green Bay Packers players
Tampa Bay Buccaneers players
Pittsburgh Steelers players
Seattle Seahawks players
Sportspeople from Mission Viejo, California